Nigel Edward Povah (born 17 July 1952 in Clapham, London) is a British chess player. He is an International Master at  chess and a Grandmaster at correspondence chess. Povah is the author of Chess Training, English: Four Knights, How to play the English and co-author of the Sicilian: Lasker-Pelikan. He is reckoned to be the UK's strongest correspondence chess player since Jonathan Penrose. Having trained as an Occupational Psychologist he started his own consulting business, Assessment & Development Consultants, which he ran for nearly 30 years before selling the business and retiring in June 2017. He also co-authored or co-edited several books relating to his field of work, namely Assessment and Development Centres, Succeeding at Assessment Centres for Dummies and Assessment Centres and Global Talent Management. He is married and lives in Guildford, Surrey.

References

External links
 
 

Living people
British chess players
Chess International Masters
1952 births